Who Guards a Prince? is a 1982 novel by Reginald Hill, the author best known for his Dalziel and Pascoe series of crime novels.

The plot of this suspense novel revolves around central character, Doug McHarg, and involves an international conspiracy of Freemasons, Scotland Yard, and extends as far as the White House and the British throne.

The book has been published both as Who Guards a Prince? and Who Guards the Prince?.

References

Publication history
1982, London: Collins 
1983, New York: Random House 
2005, New York: Felony & Mayhem Press 

1982 British novels
Novels by Reginald Hill
William Collins, Sons books